AccuWeather Inc. is an American media company that provides commercial weather forecasting services worldwide.

AccuWeather was founded in 1962 by Joel N. Myers, then a Pennsylvania State University graduate student working on a master's degree in meteorology. His first customer was a gas company in Pennsylvania. While running his company, Myers also worked as a member of Penn State's meteorology faculty. The company adopted the name "AccuWeather" in 1971.

AccuWeather is headquartered in Ferguson Township, just outside of State College, Pennsylvania, with offices at 80 Pine Street in Manhattan's Financial District in addition to Wichita, Kansas, and Oklahoma City, Oklahoma. Internationally, AccuWeather has offices in Montreal, Tokyo, Beijing, Seoul, and Mumbai.

Company profile 

AccuWeather provides weather forecasts and warnings and additional weather products and services, with clients worldwide in media, business, and government, including more than half of the Fortune 500 companies and thousands of other businesses globally. It also runs the free, advertising-supported website AccuWeather.com, an online weather provider. Third-party web analytics providers Alexa and SimilarWeb rated the site as the 200th most visited website in the United States, as of November 2015.

AccuWeather's forecasts and warning services are based on weather information derived from numerous sources, including weather observations and data gathered by the National Weather Service and meteorological organizations outside the United States, and from information provided by non-meteorological organizations such as the Environmental Protection Agency and the armed forces as well as its own proprietary models and algorithms. In 2020, AccuWeather requested and received between $5 million and $10 million in aid under the Paycheck Protection Program to avoid having to let go 462 employees due to the COVID-19 pandemic. In 2021, AccuWeather employed just under 500 people, more than 100 of whom are operational meteorologists.

AccuWeather operates a 24/7 weather channel known as The AccuWeather Network available on Spectrum TV, DIRECTV, Verizon Fios, and Frontier cable as well as Philo and FuboTV streaming services. The network broadcasts a combination of live and pre-recorded national and regional weather forecasts, analysis of ongoing weather events, and weather-related news, along with local weather segments. The network's studio and master control facilities are based at AccuWeather's headquarters near State College, Pennsylvania.

In 2006, AccuWeather acquired WeatherData, Inc. of Wichita. Renamed AccuWeather Enterprise Solutions in 2011, the Wichita facility now houses AccuWeather's specialized severe weather forecasters.

Leadership 
As of 2023, Dr. Joel N. Myers, the founder of AccuWeather, serves as CEO of the firm and chairman of the board.  His brother Evan Myers served as Chief Operating Officer until 2020 and Senior Vice President.  His other brother, Barry Lee Myers, served as chief executive officer from 2007 to January 1, 2019.

Products and services

The regular weather provider for Bloomberg Television, AccuWeather also provides guest commentary on major TV networks. AccuWeather, through the United Stations Radio Networks (previously through Westwood One until 2009), also provides weather for over 800 radio stations and over 700 newspapers, including WINS in New York City and WBBM in Chicago. During severe-weather episodes, AccuWeather employees have been called upon by television journalists such as Larry King, Geraldo Rivera, and Greta van Susteren for expert commentary. Accuweather's broadcast meteorologist Jim Kosek became an internet sensation in 2010 due to what the company describe as his "all-out, manic style" announcements, e.g. of a blizzard forecast as a "snowmaggedon".  Other well known AccuWeather meteorologists are Bernie Rayno, Brittany Boyer, Geoff Cornish and Melissa Constanzer.  AccuWeather's Chief Meteorologist is Jonathan Porter and Dan Kottlowski is AccuWeather's lead hurricane forecaster.  Elliot Abrams retired from AccuWeather in 2019 after working at AccuWeather for more than 50 years.

AccuWeather produces local weather videos each day for use on their own website, on the Local AccuWeather Network, on wired Internet, and on mobile application and websites. The mobile application has a minute-by-minute forecast and also collects crowd-sourced weather observations. The company is also active in the areas of convergence and digital signage. They have added a user-contributed video section to their photo gallery.

In 2015, AccuWeather entered into a joint venture with the Chinese company Huafeng Media Group, receiving the sole rights to deliver forecasts made by the China Meteorological Administration, a government agency that controls Huafeng.

Besides its forecasting services to individual consumers, AccuWeather performs weather-related predictive analytical services for businesses, such as determining how weather conditions have influenced past sales history and advising businesses on adapting their sales strategy for future weather events.

The Local AccuWeather Channel 

Starting in 2005, AccuWeather offered The Local AccuWeather Channel as a digital subchannel to television stations. By 2021, the service had been quietly discontinued. AccuWeather continues to provide local weather content to noncommercial Milwaukee PBS station WMVT-DT3 under a separate agreement.

National weather channel
In 2015, Verizon FiOS replaced The Weather Channel with a new 24/7 all-weather television network called "The AccuWeather Channel". This followed earlier negotiations among AccuWeather, The Weather Channel, and DirecTV.  The AccuWeather Network is a separate operation from "The Local AccuWeather Channel", which continues to run in selected markets across the country.  It became the third 24/7 weather network to launch on American television, after The Weather Channel in 1982 and WeatherNation TV in 2011. The AccuWeather Network is also carried on Spectrum TV, DIRECTV, Frontier, and on Philo and FuboTV streaming services. On August 1, 2018, the AccuWeather Network began on DIRECTV nationwide.

AccuWeather Now 
In July 2021, AccuWeather announced a companion over-the-top channel, AccuWeather Now, that will focus mainly on viral videos and shared social media content.

RealFeel temperature 
AccuWeather created a unified and proprietary apparent temperature system known as "The AccuWeather Exclusive RealFeel Temperature" and has used the quantity in its forecasts and observations. The formula for calculating this value incorporates the effects of temperature, wind, humidity, sunshine intensity, cloudiness, precipitation, and elevation on the human body, similar to the rarely used (but public domain) wet-bulb globe temperature. AccuWeather has been granted a United States patent on The RealFeel Temperature, but the formula is a trade secret and has not been reviewed by other meteorological authorities. In response to AccuWeather's "RealFeel", The Weather Channel introduced their "FeelsLike" temperature reading.

Criticisms

Long-term forecasting practices 
In April 2012, AccuWeather drastically shortened the range of their publicly available historical data from 15 years to 1 year.  They also began increasing the range of their forecast from 15 days to 25 days, 45 days, and (by 2016) to 90 days. These hyper-extended forecasts have been compared to actual results several times and shown to be misleading, inaccurate, and sometimes less accurate than simple predictions based on National Weather Service averages over a 30-year period.  It is generally accepted that the upper limit on how far one can reliably forecast is between one and two weeks, a limit based on both limits in observation systems and the chaotic nature of the atmosphere.

An informal assessment conducted by Jason Samenow at The Washington Post asserted that AccuWeather's forecasts at the 25-day range were often wrong by as many as ten degrees Fahrenheit, no better than random chance and that the forecasts missed half of the fourteen days of rain that had occurred during the month of the assessment. AccuWeather responds that it does not claim absolute precision in such extremely long forecasts and advises users to only use the forecast to observe general trends in the forecast period, but this contrasts with the way the forecasts are presented. An assessment from the Post determined that the 45-day forecasts were not even able to predict trends accurately, and that, although the forecasts did not decrease in accuracy with time, the forecasts were so far off even in the short range as to be useless. The Post commissioned another assessment from Penn State University professor Jon Nese, comparing several more cities to Accuweather's predictions; that assessment, while acknowledged as being limited to a single season, acknowledged that AccuWeather's forecasts were of value in short-range forecasting while also noting that their long-range forecasts beyond one week were less accurate than climatological averages.

National Weather Service 
The National Weather Service, which provides large amounts of the data that AccuWeather repackages and sells for profit, also provides that same information for free by placing it in the public domain.

On April 14, 2005, U.S. Senator Rick Santorum (R-PA) introduced the "National Weather Service Duties Act of 2005" in the U.S. Senate. The legislation would have forbidden the National Weather Service from providing any such information directly to the public, and the legislation was generally interpreted as an attempt by AccuWeather to profit off of taxpayer-funded weather research by forcing its delivery through private channels. AccuWeather denies this and maintains it never intended to keep weather information out of the hands of the general public. The bill did not come up for a vote. Santorum received campaign contributions from AccuWeather's president, Joel Myers.

On October 12, 2017, President Donald Trump nominated AccuWeather CEO Barry Lee Myers, the younger brother of the company's founder, to head the National Weather Service's parent administration, the National Oceanic and Atmospheric Administration. It was noted that unlike 11 of the previous 12 NOAA administrators, Myers lacks an advanced scientific degree, instead holding bachelor's and master's degrees in business and law.  Barry Myers stepped down as CEO of AccuWeather on January 1, 2019, and completely divested himself of any ownership of AccuWeather in accordance with his pledge to the Office of Government Ethics and the U.S. Senate. After two years of inaction on the nomination, Myers withdrew his consideration for nomination on November 12, 2019, due to ill health, though allegations of a hostile workplace and pervasive sexual harassment while Myers was at AccuWeather are rumored to have stalled it. Myers sent a letter to The Washington Post in 2019 to address these allegations.

iOS location privacy
In August 2017, security researcher Will Strafach intercepted traffic from the AccuWeather iPhone app to discover that it inadvertently sent location information to Reveal Mobile through a faulty SDK, even when customers have not given permission to share location information. ZDnet independently verified this information. AccuWeather immediately released an update to the App Store which removed the Reveal Mobile SDK.

See also
 Meteorological companies

References

External links 
 
 

Companies based in Centre County, Pennsylvania
State College, Pennsylvania
Technology companies of the United States
Meteorological data and networks
1962 meteorology
American companies established in 1962
Meteorological companies
1962 establishments in Pennsylvania